Rawson is the capital of the Argentine province of Chubut, in Patagonia. It has 24,616 inhabitants in 2010, and it is the chief town of the Rawson Department.

The city is named after Guillermo Rawson (1821–1890), Argentine Minister of the Interior, who supported the Welsh settlement in Argentina.

It lies on both sides of the Chubut River.

The city has a fishing port, Puerto Rawson, on the Atlantic coast,  down the river.

History

Rawson was the first town founded by the Welsh immigrants who sailed on the clipper Mimosa in 1865 to establish a national colony.

At the time of founding remains of a mud-walled fortress existed on the site. Settlers dwelled in the fortress various months while they explored the surroundings and built permanent houses. It has been posited that the fort was built in 1853 by non-Indigenous hunters who entered the area to hunt feral cattle. The fortress was known by various names by the settlers. One name was  Yr Hen Amddiffynfa  meaning "Old Fortress",  another was Caer Antur  meaning "Fort Adventure". Henry Libanus Jones had called it "Fuerte Paz" in his 1861 Explanatory notes on two maps of Patagonia.

Between 1885 and 1890 many Italians settled in Rawson. Initially many Italians worked as railway navvys but in time many moved to work in 
trade. 

The first bridge over the Chubut in Rawson was built of wood in 1889 by the carpenter and Welsh-language poet Griffith Griffiths (1829–1909), who wrote under the bardic name  and established the Patagonia Gorsedd of Bards. This bridge was destroyed by a flood ten years later, and was replaced by an iron bridge in 1917. A plaque was installed at the bridge with information on Griffiths.

Rawson was flooded in 1899 and 1901. While there had been floods before these floods caused a partial depopulation of the town with many choosing to resettle in Trelew. Trelew was temporarily made capital of Chubut in 1903 as Rawson recovered from the floods. This fuelled a rivalry between the towns which was further compounded by differences in their ethnic make-up as Rawson was more Catholic and had a higher proportion of Argentines, Italians and Spanish relative to Trelew. Rawson regained the capital status soon thereafter.

Climate
Rawson experiences a borderline cold desert (Köppen BWk)/cold semi-desert (BSk) climate with hot summers, cool winters and low precipitation year-round.

Twinned towns
 Blaenau Ffestiniog in Wales, United Kingdom

References

Attribution

External links

Interpatagonia.com: Rawson

Populated places established in 1865
Populated coastal places in Argentina
Populated places in Chubut Province
Capitals of Argentine provinces
Cities in Argentina
Argentina